Muckross may refer to various places:

Ireland
 Muckross Estate, now Killarney National Park, County Kerry; including
 Muckross Abbey
 Muckross House 
 Muckross Lake, one of the Lakes of Killarney
 Muckross Head, County Donegal
 Muckross Park College, Dublin

Scotland
 Muck Ross or Muckross, an old name for Fife Ness